James Dorsa is a composer and harpsichordist who is currently a member of the faculty at California State University Northridge's Music Department. He is most recognized for his award-winning composition of "Jupiter's Moons".

Debut Album 
In 2016, Dorsa released his debut album, Io, which featured "Jupiter's Moons", "Martinique", "The Tea Party", and "Melting Away to Nothing".  He won the Aliénor Harpsichord Composition Competition for  "Jupiter's Moons".

Educational Background 

Dorsa has a Bachelor of Music in Composition from California State University, Northridge in 2001, Master of Music in Harpsichord Performance at Cal State Northridge in 2004, and a Doctor of Musical Arts at the University of Michigan, Ann Arbor in 2008.

Sources
 Past Winners | Historical Keyboard Society of North America
 http://www.historicalkeyboardsociety.org/alienor/_docs/fall_2009.pdf
 http://www.mtacoc.org/newsletters/Newsletter-april2013web.pdf
 
 http://www.harpsichord.org.uk/sounding-board-archive/
 Sonia Lee | Pianist, Harpsichordist, Educator, Scholar
 http://www.music.umich.edu/research/stearns_collection/documents/Stearns19-1.pdf
 
 http://www.wherevent.com/detail/Mariana-Ramirez-CYAN-Ensemble
 
 http://www.linguitar.com/documents/SteveLin_Resume.pdf
 Historical Keyboard Society 2012 Joint Meeting & Festival

References

American harpsichordists
University of Michigan School of Music, Theatre & Dance alumni
California State University, Northridge alumni
California State University, Northridge faculty
American composers